Thandeka is a feminine given name.

People with the name include:
 Thandeka (minister) (born 1946), American Unitarian Universalist minister and theologian
 Thandeka Mbabama (born 1956), South African politician
 Thandeka Mdeliswa (1986–2020), South African actress
 Thandeka Zulu (born 1991), South African actress and musician

Feminine given names